John Jacob Weinzweig,  (March 11, 1913 – August 24, 2006) was a Canadian composer of classical music.

Weinzweig was born in Toronto. He went to Harbord Collegiate Institute, and studied music at the university. In 1937, he left for the United States to study under Bernard Rogers. During the Second World War, he began composing film music, and in 1952 he became a professor at his old university in Toronto. In the previous year he had co-founded the Canadian League of Composers, and he was actively involved in several other organisations representing musicians and composers.

In 1974, he was made an Officer of the Order of Canada. In 1988, he was awarded the Order of Ontario.

In 2004, Weinzweig was the recipient of the inaugural Lifetime Achievement Award at the annual SOCAN Awards in Toronto.

Early life 
John Jacob Weinzweig was the eldest child of Joseph and Rose (Burstyn) Weinzweig, Polish Jewish immigrants. His younger siblings were named Morris and Grace Weinzweig. In Russian-occupied Poland, his father was temporarily imprisoned for participating in radical union movements, and the family moved to Canada shortly after.

His first music lessons were at Workman's Circle Peretz School at the age of 14, where he participated in mandolin classes. He went on to attend Harbord Collegiate Institute, a secondary school where the students consisted primarily of the children of Jewish immigrant families. Harbord had one of the only school orchestra programs in Canada at the time, and it was here that he learned to play the tuba and saxophone, and even had the opportunity to conduct. His teacher recognized his talent and encouraged his parents to send him to piano lessons. He studied under several teachers and in the years following high school, Weinzweig attained a university entrance level in both piano and theory at the Royal Conservatory. His brother, Morris, also took up the saxophone and, from a young age, the two brothers earned pocket money by playing at local events such a school dances and political rallies. Morris went on to become a leading studio musician on the saxophone.

He married Helen Tenenbaum on July 12, 1940.

Post-secondary education 
The University of Toronto Faculty of Music was founded in 1918, but it was not until the early 1930s that it began to offer classes leading to a degree. John Weinzweig was among the first to enroll in the new program and obtained his B.Mus. in 1937. During his undergraduate degree, he was continuously producing short works, most of which were romantic and impressionistic. After observing Weinzweig's work, composer and school director Howard Hanson encouraged him to pursue Master's studies in composition at the Eastman School of Music (University of Rochester). He followed Hanson's advice and acquired his M.Mus. in 1938. During his university career, he also developed an interest in conducting, as he found that conducting experience was useful to him as a composer.

Use of serialism 
Weinzweig's move toward serialism was not a complete transition; he was very selective and deliberate in which principles he chose to adopt. While he acknowledged that Schoenberg’s influence on the musical world was powerful, he was not particularly taken with Schoeberg's music and preferred that of composers such as Berg and Webern. His attraction to serialism was not the same as that of its Viennese founders. Since he was not taught strictly using tonality in his early education, he did not feel the need to rebel and use serialism simply as a means to avoid tonality. While he often employed the techniques used by Stravinsky, Bartók, Copland and Varèse, he did not teach these methods to his students exclusively.

The way in which Weinzweig used a 12-tone row in his compositions differed from the traditional method. He would use the row as a motivic invention and develop that motive in a neoclassical manner, treating it more like a theme than a means of tonal organization. The row typically remains identifiable throughout the piece but is not limited by strict serial procedures.

Stylistic influences

Pop music 
The influence of popular music of the 1930s can be seen in Weinzweig's work, especially his Divertimentos No.2 and 3, which mimic the quirky rhythms of this music. His Divertimento No. 8 and Out of the Blue exhibit elements of both blues and ragtime. Even his Violin Concerto and Wind Quartet show characteristics of blues in their melodies.

Inuit folk materials 
Along with another choral piece composed around the same time (To the Lands Over Yonder), his piece titled Edge of the World is the first work to use Inuit folk music as compositional material.

Canadian League of Composers 
In 1951, John Weinzweig met with fellow composers Harry Somers and Samuel Dolin to discuss the issue of composing professionally in Canada. They wished to raise awareness and acceptance of Canadian music, to be listened to and taken seriously, and contacted around a dozen other Canadian composers who shared their desires. Within a year they had acquired a federal charter as the Canadian League of Composers (CLC), of which Weinzweig was the first president. Though the original members were all from close within Weinzweig's circle, the idea of the CLC was to bring composers together to work for a common cause, not to achieve a uniform national style. This mindset was much like that of the Group of Seven 30 years earlier in Canadian art.

The first project the CLC took on was to sponsor public concerts featuring new Canadian compositions. These concerts featured many different kinds of repertoire, including orchestral works, chamber music and opera, but they lacked the support of many established performing groups. Despite this, approximately 30 concerts of exclusively Canadian music occurred between the years of 1951 and 1960. The first concert, on May 16, 1951, had a program of entirely Weinzweig's music. The concert was jointly held with the Canadian Broadcasting Corporation (CBC) and the Royal Conservatory of Music (RCM) of Toronto, and was given a favourable review by the art critic for The Globe and Mail.

They next took on the task of editing an anthology of newly composed piano repertoire. This resulted in the accumulation of a small library which housed the scores of many members, and provided the use of these scores to interested conductors and performers.

In 1960, the CLC organized the International Conference of Composers as part of the Stratford music festival. This conference drew composers from 30 different countries, including Krenek, Varèse and Berio.
After a decade, national membership had grown to around 40 people, including four women, and continued to grow steadily throughout the century.

Work as an educator 

In 1939 Weinzweig was appointed to the music faculty at the Toronto Conservatory of Music where he taught through 1960 with the exception of a leave of absence in 1944. In 1952 he joined the faculty of the University of Toronto where he taught until his retirement in 1978. He continued to teach masterclasses, seminars, and workshops at a number of institutions of higher learning during the 1980s. He also taught several students privately during his lifetime. His large number of notable students include the following:

 Murray Adaskin
 Robert Aitken
 Kristi Allik
 Milton Barnes
 Robert Bauer
 John Beckwith
 Norma Beecroft
 Lorne Betts
 Howard Cable
 Brian Cherney
 Gustav Ciamaga
 Samuel Dolin
 Anne Eggleston
 John Fodi
 Clifford Ford
 Harry Freedman
 Srul Irving Glick
 Gary J. Hayes
 Richard Henninger
 David Jaeger
 Jack Kane
 Walter Kemp
 Peter Paul Koprowski
 Alfred Kunz
 Edward Laufer
 Bruce Mather
 Elma Miller
 Ben McPeek
 Mavor Moore
 Marjan Mozetich
 Phil Nimmons
 Kenneth Peacock
 Paul Pedersen
 John Rimmer
 Doug Riley
 R. Murray Schafer
 Jack Sirulnikoff
 Harry Somers
 Ben Steinberg
 Fred Stone
 Rudy Toth
 Andrew Twa
 Kenny Wheeler

Select compositions

Early works 
John Weinzweig's early works concentrate primarily on orchestra. Some pieces that he wrote as a student include Whirling Dwarf, The Enchanted Hill, and A Tale of Tuamoto (based on a Polynesian legend). While none of these gained much recognition at the time, some did receive readings by the orchestra at Eastman. One of his earliest orchestral works, written shortly after obtaining his master's degree, is Rhapsody (1941). This version was not particularly successful, but was later salvaged by one of his first pupils, Victor Feldbrill, and revived. In some of his early piano suites, the emergence of 12-tone serialism as a method of pitch organization can be seen.

In 1948, Weinzweig won a silver medal in the art competitions of the Olympic Games for his "Divertimenti for Solo Flute and Strings".

Historically significant works

Piano Sonata 
This sonata is a work that most closely represents the neoclassicism techniques of Stravinsky. The crisp, economical texture makes the piece look easy on paper. It contains a 12-note series that unfolds one or two notes at a time and keys are often implied during cadences, showing no clear effort to avoid doing so. These factor later became a trade mark of Weinzweig and can be seen in many of his works.

Red Ear of Corn 
Red Ear of Corn was the first Canadian score to be commissioned for the Canadian Ballet Festival. The material consists of a blend of Iroquois music, French-Canadian folk song and fiddle music. The music is meant to tell the story of why red cobs of corn can occasionally be found in the yellow corn fields of Québec. In this story, an Iroquois maiden is stabbed by the chief of her tribe, whom she was forcibly engaged to. It is said that red corn appears out of the ground where her blood was spilled.

This was an important work for Canada because it showed that the country's composers could write large-scale works for orchestra. It created exposure for musical material of Canadian origin, but also revealed a new treatment of folk material. Rather than just composing an accompaniment for an original folk song, Weinzweig took small rhythmic and melodic gestures from the melodies and incorporated them into his writing. This approach, inspired by Béla Bartók, continues to be used by Canadian composers today.

Suite for Piano No. 1 
This piano suite was the first Canadian composition to use Arnold Schoenberg’s 12-tone system, though in a modified form. It consists of three movements; Waltzling, Dirgeling and Themes with Variables. In this piece, the tone row is treated as motivic material used with the traditional neoclassic forms, such as ABA and theme and variations.
Waltzing exhibits another variation of this system by using a row consisting of only nine tones. This row, which seems to show a preference for minor thirds and sixths, is used as the basis of both the melody and the rhythmic ostinato that accompanies it.

The motivic repetition and overall ABA form lessens the usual harsh sound of a tone row. At the time, this piece was rejected by many colleagues and the majority of the general public.

List of works

Stage, film and radio 
The Whirling Dwarf, ballet. 1937 (Tor 1939). Med orch. Ms
4 scores for NFB films: North West Frontier; West Wind: The Story of Tom Thomson; The Great Canadian Shield; Turner Valley. (1941-5). Ms
Over 100 radio (CBC) drama scores, including Riel; Jalna; White Empire
See also Red Ear of Corn

Orchestra and band 
Legend. 1937. Full orch. Ms
The Enchanted Hill. 1938 (Rochester 1938). Full orch. Ms
Suite. 1938 (Rochester 1938). Full orch. Ms
Symphony. 1940. Full orch. Ms
Rhapsody for Orchestra. 1941 (Tor 1957). Ms
Interlude in an Artist's Life. 1943 (Tor 1944). String orch. Leeds 1961. RCI Canadian Album No. 2/5-ACM 1 (*TSO)
Our Canada. 1943 (Tor 1943). Med orch. Ms. RCI 41 (*TSO)
Band-Hut Sketches. 1944 (CBC 1944). Band. Ms
Edge of the World. 1946 (Tor 1946). Med orch. Leeds 1967. CBC SM-163 (*CBC Wpg orch)
Red Ear of Corn (suite). 1949 (Tor 1951). Med orch. Ms. 1967. CBC SM-345 (*NACO)/('Barn Dance') Dom LPS-21024/Columbia MS-6763/Citadel CT-6011 (Tor Philharmonia Orch, *Susskind cond)
Round Dance. 1950 (Tor 1950). Med orch (arr for band by Cable). Ms, Leeds 1966 (band). (Band) RCA PCS-1004/Citadel CT-6007 (*Cable cond)
Symphonic Ode. 1958 (Saskatoon 1959). Full orch. Leeds 1962. (1969). Louisville LS-76-6 (Louisville Orch)
Dummiyah/Silence. 1969 (Tor 1969). Full orch. Ms. 2-RCI 477 (B. *Brott)
Out of the Blues. 1981. Concert band. Ms
Divertimento No. 9. 1982. Full orch. Ms

Soloist(s) with orchestra 

Spectre. 1938 (Tor 1939). Timpani, string orch. Ms
A Tale of Tuamotu. 1939. Bassoon, orch. Ms
Divertimento No. 1. 1946 (Van 1946). Flute, string orch. B & H 1950. RCI 182/5-ACM 1(*CBC SO, *Day flute)/Dom S-69006 (*Aitken flute, Weinzweig cond)
Divertimento No. 2. 1948 (Tor 1948). Oboe, string orch. B & H 1951. RCI 86/5-ACM 1(*Bauman oboe, *Waddington cond)/('Finale') Marquis MAR-104 (L. *Cherney)
Violin Concerto. 1951-4 (Tor 1955). Violin, orch. Ms. RCI 183/5-ACM 1 (*CBC SO)
Wine of Peace (Calderon de la Barca, transl A. Symons, anon). 1957 (Tor 1958). Soprano, orch. Ms 1957. RCI 182/5-ACM 1 (*CBC SO)
Divertimento No. 3. 1960 (Tor 1961). Bassoon, string orch. Leeds 1963. CBC SM-15/SBC SM-317 (*CBC Van Chamb orch)
Divertimento No. 5. 1961 (Pittsburgh 1961). Trumpet, trombone, winds. Leeds 1969. RCI 292/5-ACM 1 (*Deslauriers)
Concerto for Piano and Orchestra. 1966 (Tor 1966). Ms. CBC SM-104 (*Helmer)
Concerto for Harp and Chamber Orchestra. 1967 (Tor 1967). Leeds 1969. CBC SM-55/5-ACM 1 (*Loman harp)
Divertimento No. 4. 1968 (Tor 1968). Clarinet, strings. Ms. CBC SM-134 (*Barnes cond)
Divertimento No. 6. 1972 (Tor 1972). Alto sax, strings. Ms
Divertimento No. 7. 1979 (Van 1980). Horn, strings. Ms
Divertimento No. 8. 1980. (Tor 1989). Tuba, orch. Ms
Divertimento No. 10. 1988. (Tor 1989). Piano, string orch. Ms
Divertimento No. 11. 1990. English horn, string orch. Ms.

Chamber 
String Quartet No. 1. 1937. Ms. (Mvt 2) RCI 12 (*Parlow String Quartet)
Sonata. 1941. Violin, piano. OUP 1953. CBC SM-276 (*Hidy)/Masters of the Bow MBS-2002 (*Bress)
Fanfare. 1943. 3 trumpet, 3 trombone, percussion. Ms
Intermissions. 1943. Flute, oboe. South 1964
String Quartet No. 2. 1946. Ms. Columbia MS-6364 (*Canadian String Quartet)
Cello Sonata 'Israel.' 1949. Cello, piano. Ms. CBC EXPO-14/RCI 209/5-ACM 1 (W. *Joachim cello)
String Quartet No. 3. 1962. Ms. RCI 362/5-ACM 1 (*Orford String Quartet)
Woodwind Quintet. 1964. Self-publ 1975. RCI 218/5-ACM 1/RCA CCS-1012 (*Toronto Woodwind Quintet)
Clarinet Quartet. 1965. 4 clarinet. Leeds 1970. Dom S-69004 (*Galper, McCartney, Fetherston, Temoin)
Around the Stage in 25 Minutes During Which a Variety of Instruments Are Struck. 1970. Solo percussion. Ms
Trialogue (Weinzweig). 1971. Soprano, flute, piano. Ms
Riffs. 1974. Flute. Ms
Contrasts. 1976. Guitar. Ms. 1982. Centrediscs CMC-0582/RCI 566 (Candelaria)
Pieces of 5. 1976. Brass quintet. Ms. 1981. 2-Music Gallery Editions MGE-34
Refrains. 1977. Double bass, piano. Ms
18 Pieces for Guitar. 1980. Ms
15 Pieces for Harp. 1983. Ms. CBC Musica Viva MV-1029 (*Loman)
Music Centre Serenade. 1984. Flute, horn, viola, cello. Ms
Conversations for Three Guitars. 1984. Ms
Cadenza. 1986. Clarinet. Ms
Birthday Notes. 1987. Flute, piano. Ms
Tremologue. 1987. Viola. Ms

Piano and organ 

Suite for Piano No. 1. 1939. Ms, Frederick Harris 1955 (mvt 1)
Improvisations on an Indian Tune. 1942. Organ. Ms
Swing a Fugue. 1949. Piano. Ms
Melos. 1949. Piano. Ms
Piano Sonata. 1950. Cramer 1981. CBC SM-162 (*Buczynski)/Elaine Keillor WRC1-3315 (*Keillor)
Suite for Piano No. 2. 1950. OUP 1956 (mvt 2); OUP 1965 (mvt 1 and 3). 1970. (Mvt 2) CBC SM-99 (Angela Florou)
Impromptus. 1973. Piano. Ms
CanOn Stride. 1986. Piano. Musical Canada
Tango for Two. 1986 (rev 1987). Piano (hp). Ms
Micromotions. 1988. Piano. Ms
3 Pieces for piano. 1989. Piano. Ms
Duologue. 1990. 2 piano. Ms

Choir and voice 
'To the Lands Over Yonder' (Inuit). 1945. SATB. Frederick Harris 1953. Self-publ 1974
'Of Time, Rain and the World' (Weinzweig). 1947. Voice, piano. Ms. RCI 20/5-ACM 1(*James)
'Dance of the Masada' (I. Lamdan). 1951. Baritone, piano. Ms. RCA LSC-3092 (Fine bass)/Master MA-275 (D. *Mills bass)
'Am Yisrael Chai!'/'Israel Lives!' (Malka Lee, English transl Weinzweig). 1952. SATB, piano. Leeds 1964
Private Collection (Weinzweig). 1975. Soprano, piano. Ms. Centrediscs CMC-0582 (*Fallis)
Choral Pieces. 1985–86. SATB. Ms

Writings 
'The new music,' CRMA, vol 5, Jun 1942
'A composer looks at the teaching of musical theory,' ConsB, Nov 1949
'Notes on a visit to Britain,' CanComp, 21, 22, Sep, Oct 1967
'Address,' Report on the John Adaskin Project Policy Conference, CMCentre, Toronto, 25 Nov 1967
'Writings by John Weinzweig,' eds. R. and P. Henninger, CMB, 6, Spring-Sumer 1973
'Vancouver Symposium 1950,' Canadian League of Composers,' Newsletter, 1, Sep 1980
'A wry look at our music,' CanComp, 175, Oct 1982
'John Weinzweig: His Words and His Music,' Grimsby, Ont, 1986
'The making of a composer,' CanComp, 211, May 1986
'John Weinzweig,' Canadian Music of the 1930s and 1940s, ed. Beverley Cavanagh, CanMus Handbooks 2, Kingston, Ont, 1987
'The diary of a song ... Hockey Night in Canada,' CanComp, 224, Oct 1989
'Sounds and Reflections,' Grimsby, Ont, 1990

Bibliography 
Beckwith, John (1997).  Music Papers: Articles and Talks by a Canadian Composer. Ottawa, Ontario: The Golden Dog Press.
Beckwith, John, and Cherney, Brian, eds. (2011). Weinzweig: Essays on His Life and Music. Waterloo, Ontario: Wilfrid Laurier University Press.
Keillor, Elaine (1994). John Weinzweig and his Music – The Radical Romantic of Canada. London: The Scarecrow Press, Inc.
MacMillan, Ernest (1955). Music in Canada. Toronto, Ontario: University of Toronto Press.
Proctor, George A. (1951). Canadian Music of the Twentieth Century. Toronto, Ontario: University of Toronto Press.
Schafer, R. Murray (1984). On Canadian Music. Bancroft, Ontario: Arcana Editions.
Steenhuisen, Paul.  "Interview with John Weinzweig".  In Sonic Mosaics: Conversations with Composers.  Edmonton:  University of Alberta Press, 2009.  
Encyclopedia of Music in Canada

External links 
John Weinzweig website
Canadian Music Centre – John Weinzweig Biography and Works
Living Composers Project (biography, work list)
John Weinzweig at The Canadian Encyclopedia
 directed by Peter Kambasis

Notes 

1913 births
2006 deaths
Canadian male composers
Canadian film score composers
Male film score composers
Jewish Canadian musicians
Canadian people of Polish-Jewish descent
Members of the Order of Ontario
Canadian music educators
Officers of the Order of Canada
Olympic silver medalists for Canada
Olympic silver medalists in art competitions
Musicians from Toronto
Academic staff of The Royal Conservatory of Music
University of Toronto alumni
Academic staff of the University of Toronto
Pupils of Bernard Rogers
20th-century Canadian composers
Medalists at the 1948 Summer Olympics
20th-century Canadian male musicians
Olympic competitors in art competitions
Canadian expatriates in the United States